The establishment of industrial ecology as field of scientific research is commonly attributed to an article devoted to industrial ecosystems, written by Frosch and Gallopoulos, which appeared in a 1989 special issue of Scientific American. Industrial ecology emerged from several earlier ideas and concepts, some of which date back to the 19th century.

Before the 1960s 

The term "industrial ecology" has been used alongside "industrial symbiosis" at least since the 1940s. Economic geography was perhaps one of the first fields to use these terms. For example, in an article published in 1947, George T. Renner refers to "The General Principle of Industrial Location" as a "Law of Industrial Ecology". Briefly stated this is:

In the same article the author defines and describes industrial symbiosis:

It appears that the concept of Industrial Symbiosis was not new for the field of economic geography, since the same categorization is used by Walter G. Lezius in his 1937 article "Geography of Glass Manufacture at Toledo, Ohio", also published in the Journal of Economic Geography.

Used in a different context, the term "Industrial Ecology" is also found in a 1958 paper concerned with the relationship between the ecological impact from increasing urbanization and value orientations of related peoples. The case study is in Lebanon:

1960s 

In 1963, we find the term Industrial Ecology (defined as the "complex ecology of the modern industrial world") being used to describe the social nature and complexity of (and within) industrial systems:

In 1967, the President of the American association for the advancement of science writes in "The experimental city" that "There are examples of industrial symbiosis where one industry feeds off, or at least neutralizes, the wastes of another..." The same author in 1970 talks about "The Next Industrial Revolution" The concept of material and energy sharing and reuse is central to his proposal for a new industrial revolution and he cites agro-industrial symbiosis as a practical way for achieving this:

In these early articles, "Industrial Ecology" is used in its literal sense - as a system of interacting industrial entities. The relation to natural ecosystems (through either metaphor or analogy) is not explicit. Industrial Symbiosis on the other hand, is already clearly defined as a type of industrial organization, and the term symbiosis is borrowed from the ecological sciences to describe an analogous phenomenon in industrial systems.

1970s 

Industrial Ecology has been a research subject of the Japan Industrial Policy Research Institute since 1971. Their definition of Industrial Ecology is "research for the prospect of dynamic harmonization between human activities and nature by a systems approach based upon ecology (JIPRI, 1983)". This programme has resulted to a number of reports that are available only in Japanese.

One of the earliest definitions of  Industrial Ecology was proposed by Harry Zvi Evan at a seminar of the Economic Commission of Europe in Warsaw (Poland) in 1973 (an article was subsequently published by Evan in the Journal for International Labour Review in 1974 vol. 110 (3), pp. 219–233). Evan defined Industrial Ecology as a systematic analysis of industrial operations including factors like: Technology, environment, natural resources, bio-medical aspects, institutional and legal matters as well as the socio-economic aspects.

In 1974 the term of Industrial Ecology is perhaps for the first time associated with a cyclical production mode (rather than a linear one, resulting to waste). In this article, the necessity for a transition to an "open-world Industrial Ecology", is used as argument for the need to establish lunar industries:

Many elements of modern Industrial Ecology were commonplace in the industrial sectors of the former Soviet Union. For example, “kombinirovanaia produksia” (combined production) was present from the earliest years of the Soviet Union and was instrumental in shaping the patterns of Soviet industrialization. “Bezotkhodnoyi tekhnologii” (waste-free technology) was introduced in the final decades of the USSR as a way to increase industrial production while limiting environmental impact. Fiodor Davitaya, a Soviet scientist from the Republic of Georgia, described in 1977 the analogy relating industrial systems to natural systems as a model for a desirable transition to cleaner production:

1980s 

By the 80s Industrial Ecology was already "promoted" to a research subject, which several institutes around the globe embraced. In a 1986 article published in Ecological Modelling, there is a full description of Industrial Ecology and the analogy to natural ecosystems is clearly stated:

In fact, in the above article there is an attempt to model an "industrial ecological system". The model is composed of seven major sections: industry, population, labor force, living state, environment and pollution, general health, and occupational health. Notice the rough similarity with Evan's factors as stated in the above section.

During the 80s the emergence of another related term, "industrial metabolism", is observed. The term is used as a metaphor for the organization and functioning of industrial activity. In an article defending the "biological modulation of terrestrial carbon cycle", the author includes an extraordinary parenthetical note:

1989 – Decisive articles 

In 1989 two articles were released that played a decisive role in the history of industrial ecology. The first one was titled "Industrial Metabolism" by Robert Ayres. Ayres essentially lays the foundations of Industrial Ecology, although the term is not to be found in this article. In the appendix of the article he includes "a theoretical exploration of the biosphere and the industrial economy as material-transformation systems and lessons that might be learned from their comparison". He proposes that:

The term "Industrial Ecology" gains mainstream attention later the same year (1989) through a "Scientific American" article named "Strategies for Manufacturing". In this article, R.Frosch and N.Gallopoulos wonder "why would not our industrial system behave like an ecosystem, where the wastes of a species may be resource to another species? Why would not the outputs of an industry be the inputs of another, thus reducing use of raw materials, pollution, and saving on waste treatment?"

This vision gave birth to the concept of the Eco-industrial Park, the industrial complex that is governed by Industrial Ecology principles. A notable example resides in a Danish industrial park in the city of Kalundborg. There, several linkages of byproducts and waste heat can be found between numerous entities such as a large power plant, an oil refinery, a pharmaceutical plant, a plasterboard factory, an enzyme manufacturer, a waste company and the city itself.

Frosch's and Gallopoulos' thinking was in certain ways simply an extension of earlier ideas, such as the efficiency and waste-reduction thinking annunciated by Buckminster Fuller and his students (e.g., J. Baldwin), and parallel ideas about energy cogeneration, such as those of Amory Lovins and the Rocky Mountain Institute.

1990s 

In 1991, C. Kumar Patel organized a seminal colloquium on Industrial Ecology, held on May 20 and 21, 1991, at the National Academy of Sciences in Washington D.C. The papers were later published in the Proceedings of the National Academy of Sciences USA, and they form an excellent reference on Industrial Ecology. Papers include:

21st century 

The Journal of Industrial Ecology (since 1997), the International Society for Industrial Ecology (since 2001), and the journal Progress in Industrial Ecology (since 2004) have covered industrial ecology in the international scientific community. Principles of industrial ecology are also emerging in various policy realms such as the concept of the circular economy that is being promoted in China. Although the definition of the circular economy has yet to be formalized, generally the focus is on strategies such as creating a circular flow of materials, and cascading energy flows. An example of this would be using waste heat from one process to run another process that requires a lower temperature. This maximizes the efficiency of exergy use. This strategy aims for a more efficient economy with fewer pollutants and other unwanted by-products.

Sources

Industrial ecology
History of science